William Blake Crouch (born October 15, 1978) is an American author best known for his Wayward Pines Trilogy, which was adapted into the 2015 television series Wayward Pines.

Early life and education
Crouch was born near the town of Statesville, North Carolina. He attended North Iredell High School and the University of North Carolina at Chapel Hill, graduating in 2000 with degrees in English and creative writing.

Career
Crouch published his first two novels, Desert Places and Locked Doors, in 2004 and 2005. His stories have appeared in Ellery Queen's Mystery Magazine, Alfred Hitchcock's Mystery Magazine, Thriller 2, and other anthologies. In 2016, he released the novel Dark Matter.

Crouch's Wayward Pines Trilogy (2012–14) was adapted into the 2015 television series Wayward Pines. Another work, Good Behavior, premiered as a television series in November 2016.

In 2019, Crouch released another sci-fi novel, titled Recursion, to critical success.

In 2020, Crouch began working on a screenplay to adapt Dark Matter into a feature film for Sony Pictures.

Personal life

Crouch married Rebecca Greene on June 20, 1998. They have three children together. The couple divorced in 2017. As of 2019, Crouch is dating Jacque Ben-Zekry. 

In 2021, Crouch filed a court case appealing to modify his and Greene's joint agreement for medical decision-making authority for their children, to allow him to vaccinate them over Greene's religious-based objections.

Bibliography

Andrew Z. Thomas / Luther Kite series
 Desert Places (2004)
 Locked Doors (2005)
 Break You (2011)
 Stirred (with J.A. Konrath, 2011)

Wayward Pines Trilogy
 Pines (2012)
 Wayward (2013)
 The Last Town (2014)

Stand-alone novels
 Abandon (2009)
 Famous (2010)
 Snowbound (2010)
 Run (2011)
 Eerie (with Jordan Crouch) (2012)
 Dark Matter (2016)
 Good Behavior (2016)
 Summer Frost (2019)
 Recursion (2019)
 Upgrade (2022)

References

External links

 
 
 
 Bookseller news article on Blake Crouch
 BlogTalkRadio interview with Modern Signed Books host Rodger Nichols October 27, 2017

1978 births
Living people
21st-century American male writers
21st-century American novelists
21st-century American short story writers
American horror novelists
American male novelists
American male short story writers
American mystery writers
American science fiction writers
American thriller writers
Novelists from North Carolina
People from Statesville, North Carolina
University of North Carolina at Chapel Hill alumni